Barnaby Fitzpatrick (Irish: Brian Mac Giolla Phádraig), 5th Baron Upper Ossory (died c. 1639–41) was the son and heir of Teige Fitzpatrick, 4th Baron Upper Ossory.

Family and life
Barnaby inherited the Barony of Upper Ossory from his father Teige Fitzpatrick, 4th Baron Upper Ossory, great-grandson of Barnaby Fitzpatrick, 1st Baron Upper Ossory and lineal descendant of the former kings of Osraige.  His mother was Joan Butler, daughter of Sir Edmund Butler, son of James Butler, 9th Earl of Ormond.  On 14 July 1634, he took his seat in Parliament.  He married Margaret Butler, eldest daughter of Walter Butler, 11th Earl of Ormond. He died sometime before 16 March 1639/40, according to William Carrigan or by 1641 by other sources.

From his wife Margaret Butler, he had issue:
Brian, aka Barnaby Fitzpatrick, 6th Baron Upper Ossory, his heir and successor
Edward Fitzpatrick (or Edmund)
James Fitzpatrick

Notes

References

External links
The Fitzpatrick – Mac Giolla Phádraig Clan Society
 Descendants of Bryan Fitzpatrick, Lord and First Baron of Upper Ossory by Ronan Fitzpatrick and Steve Zalewski

Barnaby
Barons in the Peerage of Ireland